Independent Online, popularly known as IOL, is a news website based in South Africa.

IOL serves the online versions of a number of South African newspapers, including The Star, Pretoria News, The Daily Voice, Cape Times, Cape Argus, Weekend Argus, The Mercury, Post, Diamond Fields Advertiser, Isolezwe, Daily Tribune, Sunday Tribune, The Independent on Saturday, and The Sunday Independent.

Corporate affairs

Ownership 
Sekunjalo Investments owns 55% of the company via its subsidiary Sekunjalo Independent Media, the Public Investment Corporation of South Africa owns 25%, and two Chinese state-owned enterprises (China International Television Corporation and the China Africa Development Fund) own the remaining 20% of the newspaper. China International Television Corporation is a wholly-owned subsidiary of state broadcaster China Central Television (CCTV). Before 2013, IOL was owned by the Independent News & Media. 

IOL regularly distributes Chinese state media content.

Management 
Vasantha Angamuthu is the CEO of Independent Online, and Lance Witten is Editor.

Reaction 
In 2018, Reporters Without Borders reported that an IOL columnist was forced out after publishing a column condemning the persecution of Uyghurs.

According to The Economist, IOL "often engages in 'information laundering' designed to make sentiment appear homegrown, says Herman Wasserman at the University of Cape Town. For instance, it will run a Chinese news-agency story on the biolab conspiracy, then get a left-wing student leader to write an article expressing concern about the supposed biolabs. Chinese news agencies will use that to write about how South Africans are worried, thus manufacturing a 'story' out of nothing at all."

See also 

 List of newspapers in South Africa

References

External links
 

South African news websites
Daily newspapers published in South Africa
Online newspapers published in South Africa
Mass media in Cape Town